Ouvrage Mottenberg is a lesser work (petit ouvrage) of the Maginot Line.  Part of the Fortified Sector of Boulay, the ouvrage consists of one entrance block and two infantry blocks, and is located between petits ouvrages Coume Annexe Sud and Kerfent, facing Germany.

Design and construction 
The site was surveyed by CORF (Commission d'Organisation des Régions Fortifiées), the Maginot Line's design and construction agency; Mottenberg was approved for construction in September 1931. It was completed at a cost of 13 million francs by the contractor Societé Alsacienne des Travaux Publics. The petit ouvrage was to receive a separate entrance block, an 81mm mortar turret and a 135mm gun turret in a second phase, never carried out

Description 
Mottenberg comprises three infantry blocks. The blocks are linked by deep underground galleries, which also provide space for barracks, utilities and ammunition storage.
Block 1: infantry/entry block with two automatic rifle cloches (GFM), one observation cloche (VDP), one twin machine gun embrasure and one machine gun/anti-tank gun embrasure (JM/AC47).
Block 2: Infantry block with one GFM cloche and one JM cloche.
Block 3: Infantry block with one GFM cloche and one retractable twin machine gun turret.

The second phase of construction was to add an 81mm mortar turret block, a 135mm gun turret block and an entry block, as well as underground support facilities.

Casemates and shelters 
In addition to the connected combat blocks, a series of detached casemates and infantry shelters surround Mottenberg, including
 Casemate Sud du Mottenberg: Double block with two JM/AC47 embrasures, one JM embrasure, one 81mm mortar embrasure and two GFM cloches. Destroyed in 1940 by German assault.

Manning 
The 1940 manning of the ouvrage under the command of Captain Cloarec comprised 145 men and 3 officers of the 160th Fortress Infantry Regiment. The units were under the umbrella of the 3rd Army, Army Group 2. The Casernement de Ban Saint-Jean provided peacetime above-ground barracks and support services to Coume and other positions in the area.

History 
See Fortified Sector of Boulay for a broader discussion of the Boulay sector of the Maginot Line.
On 21 June 1940, Mottenberg fired on German troops attacking petit ouvrage Kerfent.  Since Mottenberg was only able to use machine gun fire, the intervention was unsuccessful and Kerfent surrendered. After World War II, Mottenberg was in poor condition and was not chosen for renovation.

Current condition 
All above-ground elements such as cloches and turrets have been salvaged, with few other elements visible.

See also 
 List of all works on Maginot Line
 Siegfried Line
 Atlantic Wall
 Czechoslovak border fortifications

Notes

References

Bibliography 
Allcorn, William. The Maginot Line 1928-45. Oxford: Osprey Publishing, 2003. 
Kaufmann, J.E. and Kaufmann, H.W. Fortress France: The Maginot Line and French Defenses in World War II, Stackpole Books, 2006. 
Kaufmann, J.E., Kaufmann, H.W., Jancovič-Potočnik, A. and Lang, P. The Maginot Line: History and Guide, Pen and Sword, 2011. 
Mary, Jean-Yves; Hohnadel, Alain; Sicard, Jacques. Hommes et Ouvrages de la Ligne Maginot, Tome 1. Paris, Histoire & Collections, 2001.  
Mary, Jean-Yves; Hohnadel, Alain; Sicard, Jacques. Hommes et Ouvrages de la Ligne Maginot, Tome 2. Paris, Histoire & Collections, 2003.  
Mary, Jean-Yves; Hohnadel, Alain; Sicard, Jacques. Hommes et Ouvrages de la Ligne Maginot, Tome 3. Paris, Histoire & Collections, 2003.  
Mary, Jean-Yves; Hohnadel, Alain; Sicard, Jacques. Hommes et Ouvrages de la Ligne Maginot, Tome 5. Paris, Histoire & Collections, 2009.

External links
 Ouvrage du Mottenberg at alsacemaginot.com 
 Mottenberg (petit ouvrage A33 du) at fortiff.be 
 Petit ouvrage du Mottenberg at lignemaginot.com 

MOTT
Maginot Line